thumb|340px|alt=Map_of_Pennsylvania|Compare this map with its major roads of today and its terrains with the above canal system map.
The Susquehanna Canal of the Pennsylvania Canal System was funded and authorized as part of the 1826 Main Line of Public Works enabling act, and would later become the Susquehanna Division of the Pennsylvania Canal under the Pennsylvania Canal Commission. Constructed early on in America's brief canal age, it formed an integral segment of the water focused transportation system which cut Philadelphia-Pittsburgh (pre-railroad) travel time from nearly a month to just four days. One of the system's navigations, the Susquehanna Canal/division created a mule-towed navigable channel  along the west bank of the main stem of the Susquehanna River between a lock terminus near the mouth of the Juniata Tributary River and the canal basin at Northumberland. Meeting the West Branch Canal and the North Branch Canal at Northumberland, it formed a link between the public and private canals upriver and the main east–west Pennsylvania Canal route known as the Main Line of Public Works which was devised to connect Philadelphia to Pittsburgh, southern New York, northern Pennsylvania and Lake Erie using most of the far reaches of the Susquehanna's tributaries.

The engineering needs of the Susquehanna Canal, were modest in comparison to many contemporary projects, and construction was timed after other more difficult projects in the system were well under way. The Susquehanna Division Canal employed 12 locks overcoming a total of just  in its s length  It was begun in 1827 and was finished in 1831 in time to connect to traffic between the Union Canal and the Allegheny Portage Railroad, which lifted wheeled canal barges up one of the gaps of the Allegheny and over the Allegheny Plateau into the Allegheny-Ohio valleys.

Engineers faced complications at the southern end of the Susquehanna Division Canal, where it met the Juniata Division Canal and the Eastern Division Canal at Duncan's Island. Boats had to cross from one side of the Susquehanna River to the other between either the Susquehanna Division or the Juniata Division on the west side and the Eastern Division on the east side. This formed a pool across which boats could be pulled from a wooden, two-tier towpath bridge at Clark's Ferry. Two Duncan's Island lift locks raised or lowered the boats traveling between the dam pool and the other canals.

See also
 List of canals in the United States
 Delaware Canal - A canal feeding urban Philadelphia connecting with the Morris and Lehigh Canals at their respective Easton terminals.
 Delaware and Raritan Canal – A New Jersey canal connection to the New York & New Jersey markets shipping primarily coal across the Delaware River. The D&R also shipped Iron Ore from New Jersey up the Lehigh.
 Chesapeake and Delaware Canal – A canal crossing the Delmarva Peninsula in the states of Delaware and Maryland, connecting the Chesapeake Bay with the Delaware Bay.
 Delaware and Hudson Canal - Another early built coal canal as the American canal age began; contemporary with the Lehigh and the Schuylkill navigations.
 Lehigh Canal – A sister canal in the Lehigh Valley that fed coal traffic to the Delaware Canal via a connection in Easton, Pennsylvania.
 Schuylkill Canal - Navigation joining Reading, PA and Philadelphia.

Points of interest

Notes

References

External links
 Pennsylvania Canal Society
 American Canal Society
 National Canal Museum

Canals in Pennsylvania
Transportation buildings and structures in Dauphin County, Pennsylvania
Transportation buildings and structures in Juniata County, Pennsylvania
Transportation buildings and structures in Northumberland County, Pennsylvania
Transportation buildings and structures in Perry County, Pennsylvania
Transportation buildings and structures in Snyder County, Pennsylvania
Canals opened in 1831